Benjamin Wyatt Beckwith (born December 27, 1991) is a former American football Guard. He played college football for Mississippi State, where he began his career as a walk-on, but wound up starting in the 2013 and 2014 seasons. In 2014, he was named SEC Offensive Lineman of the Week three times and was a finalist for the Burlsworth Trophy. He has been a member of the San Diego Chargers of the National Football League (NFL).

Professional career
After going unselected in the 2015 NFL Draft, Beckwith signed with the San Diego Chargers on May 3, 2015.

On January 2, 2016, Beckwith was waived by the Chargers.

References

External links
San Diego Chargers bio

1991 births
Living people
Mississippi State Bulldogs football players
San Diego Chargers players
American football offensive linemen
People from Yazoo County, Mississippi
People from Flowood, Mississippi